Roy Keith Binney (13 April 1885–28 October 1957) was a New Zealand architect and soldier. He was born in Auckland, Auckland Region, New Zealand on 13 April 1885. He designed some of the most notable houses in Remuera and Parnell.

References

1885 births
1957 deaths
New Zealand architects
New Zealand military personnel
People from Auckland